Scandinavian Political Studies is a quarterly peer-reviewed academic journal covering political science in the Nordic countries published by Wiley-Blackwell. The current joint editors-in-chief are Åse Gornitzka (Oslo University) and Carl Henrik Knutsen (Oslo University).

Abstracting and indexing 
The journal is abstracted and indexed in:

According to the Journal Citation Reports, the journal has a 2014 impact factor of 1.114, ranking it 50th out of 161 journals in the category "Political Science".

See also 
 List of political science journals

References

External links 
 

English-language journals
Political science journals
Publications established in 1966
Quarterly journals
Wiley-Blackwell academic journals